The American Music Award for Favorite Adult Contemporary New Artist was first awarded in 1992, but discontinued since 1994. Years reflect the year during which the awards were presented, for works released in the previous year. New Artists are still recognized, but the prize is awarded without regard to music genre.

Winners and nominees

1990s

References

American Music Awards
Music awards for breakthrough artist
Awards established in 1992
Awards disestablished in 1994